The abbreviation CCRC may refer to:
 Capital College and Research Centre
 CCRC, a Canadian Christian music record chart
 City of Cambridge Rowing Club, a rowing club in Cambridge, England
 ClearCase Remote Client, a feature of IBM Rational ClearCase
 Climate Change Research Centre, an Australian research initiative focussing on climate change
Community College Research Center
 Continuing Care Retirement Communities
 Criminal Cases Review Commission, an investigative body that reviews possible miscarriages of justice in England, Wales and Northern Ireland
 Scottish Criminal Cases Review Commission, a similar investigative body that reviews possible miscarriages of justice in Scotland

Children groups
Canadian Children's Rights Council, a Canadian advocacy organization created in 1991
Canadian Coalition for the Rights of Children, a children's rights organization created in 1989
Crimes against Children Research Center, a research group directed by David Finkelhor, created in 1998